Miguelita Creek, originating in  East Foothills, California, above the San Jose Country Club, is a tributary of Lower Silver Creek, which is a tributary of Coyote Creek, a river in Santa Clara County, California.

Course

The creek flows along the south side of Miguelita Road, through a canyon under Alum Rock Road, and into the San Jose Country Club, where several small golf-cart bridges cross it.  Then it runs into the city limits of San Jose, between Holmes Drive and Fairway Drive, to a culvert at Fairway Drive and McKee Road, where it runs underground.  

The GNIS has two entries for Miguelita Creek.  For feature ID 228642, the mouth coordinates are where the creek goes underground at Fairway Drive, and source is near Miguelita Drive. Feature ID 228641, the lower creek, has mouth coordinates where Lower Silver Creek enters Coyote Creek, and source near Lanning Way, where the creek re-emerges from underground.  The lower creek segment merges with Lower Silver Creek near King Road and Schulte Drive.

According to historical maps, the upper creek originally ran north to Penitencia Creek, before the lower channel was built to divert it straight to Coyote Creek.

References

Rivers of Northern California
Rivers of Santa Clara County, California